Robert Howie (11 June 1898 – 14 May 1992) was a  international rugby union player. He played for Kirkcaldy RFC.

Rugby Union career

Amateur career
He played for Kirkcaldy RFC.

Provincial career
Howie was capped by Midlands District.

International career

Referee career
He refereed the Inter-City match between Glasgow District and Edinburgh District in 1928.

Family
Bob Howie was the brother of Dave Howie, who also played for Kirkcaldy and gained seven national caps, but died in the First World War.

Although he and his brother gained fourteen caps between them their father, a grim farmer, never watched them once, saying:

"Rugby an' fermin' will no agree, an' A ken which'll pit mair money in yer pooch."

References
 Bath, Richard (ed.) The Scotland Rugby Miscellany (Vision Sports Publishing Ltd, 2007 )
 Massie, Allan A Portrait of Scottish Rugby (Polygon, Edinburgh)

1898 births
1992 deaths
British & Irish Lions rugby union players from Scotland
Kirkcaldy RFC players
Midlands District players
Rugby union players from Midlothian
Scotland international rugby union players
Scottish Districts referees
Scottish rugby union players
Scottish rugby union referees